Gautam Rode (born 14 August 1977) is an Indian television actor known for his roles in Baa Bahoo Aur Baby, Lucky, Saraswatichandra, Suryaputra Karn, and Kaal Bhairav Rahasya 2.

Early life
Rode was born on 14 August 1977. Earlier, Rode and his family used to stay in New Delhi, but later they shifted to Mumbai. Rode's father, Surendra Rode is a retired broker and his mother, Sangeeta Rode is a jewellery designer. Rode did his schooling from Army Public School, Dhaula Kuan in Delhi. He completed his college from Shaheed Bhagat Singh College.

Career
Rode made his debut to Indian television with the show Jahan Pyaar Mile on Zee TV. In 2000, he played episodic roles in TV shows such as Rishtey, Apna Apna Style and Thriller at 10. In 2002, he made his debut to Bollywood with the film Annarth co-starred Sanjay Dutt, Sunil Shetty and Preeti Jhangiani. He played the role of Inspector Sameer Deshmukh in this film. Taran Adarsh of entertainment portal of Bollywood Hungama wrote of his performance, "Newcomer Gautam Rode has good screen presence and impresses as an actor. He does very well in stunts."

In 2005, he appeared in his second film, U, Bomsi & Me alongside Sonal Sehgal and Vivek Madan. He played the role of Sam Mac Patel a radio jockey who wants to be a writer and a famous one at that. Taran Adarsh wrote of his performance, "Gautam, who made his debut in ANNARTH [with Sanju, Suniel], has evolved as an actor. He is excellent in [emotional] sequences when his wife walks out on him." In 2005, he played his first noticeable role of television of Anish Kotak in Baa Bahu Aur Baby.

In the same year he also played his first lead role and the title role of Lucky in the show, Lucky. He later did supporting and cameo roles in shows which include Princess Dollie Aur Uska Magic Bag (2006), Betiyaan Apni Yaa Paraaya Dhan (2006), Ssshhhh...Koi Hai (2008), Simplly Sapney (2008), Rubi (2008), Babul Ka Aangann Chootey Na (2008). In 2009, Rode featured in the film Agyaat alongside Nithin and Priyanka Kothari. He played the role of Sharman Kapoor a completely self-obsessed man with no other concern except for his muscles and the leading lady, Aasha. Taran Adarsh wrote of his performance "Gautam Rode enacts the hot-headed superstar with conviction." Agyaat grossed  domestically.

In 2010, he did supporting and cameo roles on television in the shows Mata Ki Chowki, Kashi – Ab Na Rahe Tera Kagaz Kora, Crime & Bollywood, Maan Rahe Tera Pitaah and Aahat. In 2010, he entered the show Mera Naam Karegi Roshan as Samvad, a guy who tries and spreads joy and cheers in everybody's life. In 2011, he entered the show, Parichay as Vineet Saxena. In 2012, he played an episodic role of Tarun in the show, Teri Meri Love Stories. In the same year, he hosted the reality dance show Nach Baliye 5 alongside Karan Wahi.
cIn 2013, he played the lead and title role in Sanjay Leela Bhansali's show, Saraswatichandra opposite Jennifer Winget. The show proved to be a turning point in his career and got him lot of popularity and appreciation. In 2013, he also hosted Nach Baliye 6 alongside Karan Wahi. The show Saraswatichandra ended on 20 September 2014.

In 2015, he did another show, Maha Kumbh: Ek Rahasaya, Ek Kahani a mythological thriller. He played the role of Rudra in the show who is a "Garud", who has the duty of saving mankind. The show failed to impress the audience and ended in April 2015. In 2015, he entered the show Suryaputra Karn as the lead of the show, Karna. The show ended in July 2016. In August 2016, Rode signed Anant Mahadevan's Aksar 2 opposite Zarine Khan. The motion poster of the movie was released on 4 August 2017 on YouTube.

In 2018, Rode starred as Prince Veer in the Star Bharat's mystery thriller show Kaal Bhairav Rahasya Season 2 alongside Additi Gupta. From 2019 to 2020, he has been played Abhijeet in SAB TV's Bhakarwadi. In 2021, Rode played the role of Major Samar in the action thriller film State of Siege: Temple Attack, which was directed by Ken Ghosh and released on Zee5 on 9 July 2021. Later that year, Rode starred as Pawan Bisht in the MX Player original series Nakaab alongside Esha Gupta and Mallika Sherawat.

Personal life
He is a fitness enthusiast and a vegetarian. He currently stays in Kandivali, Mumbai. He married his co-actress Pankhuri Awasthy Rode.

Filmography

Films

Television

Web series

Music videos

Awards and nominations

See also 
 List of Indian television actors

References

External links

Living people
1977 births
Male actors from Delhi
Indian male film actors
Indian male models
Indian male television actors
Indian male soap opera actors
21st-century Indian male actors
Indian television presenters